Kimmitt is a surname. Notable people with the surname include: 

Joseph Stanley Kimmitt (1918–2004), the Secretary of the United States Senate and Secretary for the Majority from 1977 to 1981
Mark Kimmitt (born 1954), the 16th Assistant Secretary of State for Political-Military Affairs, under George W. Bush from Aug 2008 to Jan 2009
Robert M. Kimmitt (born 1947), United States Deputy Secretary of the Treasury under President George W. Bush

See also
Kimi tte
Kimito